Sarah Dance was the female winner of the National Collegiate Athletic Association's highest academic honor, the 2005 Walter Byers Award, in recognition of being the nation's top female scholar-athlete.  She was a 28-time All-American swimmer who helped lead Truman State University to four national championships.

Notes

American female swimmers
Living people
Truman Bulldogs women's swimmers
Year of birth missing (living people)